Wang Zhi (born July 29, 1982) is a Chinese actress. She first rose to prominence in 2015 for playing Qiu Ya in the comedy film Goodbye Mr. Loser, which placed third at the box office with US$226.6 million in China.

Biography

Early life and education
A native of Anshan, Liaoning, she started to learn martial arts at the age of five. In 2004, she enrolled at the Central Academy of Drama, where she studied alongside Tong Liya. After graduation in 2008, she became a village official in Zhangzikou Village of Yangsong Town near Beijing. She worked there for three years.

Career
Wang's first role was a nurse uncredited appearance in the television series Witness (2007).

In 2008, she has appeared in a number of television productions, such as Eighteen Years in Enemy Camp, One Hundred Years of History, and Fruit of marriage.

In 2011, she got a small role in the historical television series All Men Are Brothers, adapted from Shi Nai'an's classical novel Water Margin.

In 2012, she was cast in Ma Yongzhen, playing the sister of Danny Chan Kwok-kwan's character.

In 2013, she had a cameo appearance in Ju Jueliang's The Patriot Yue Fei, a historical television series starring Huang Xiaoming, Ruby Lin, Gallen Lo, and Cheng Pei-pei. She had a supporting role in Painted Skin 2, opposite Hawick Lau and Michelle Bai. That same year, she was cast in the film Drug War, playing the wife of Louis Koo's character. She also provided the voice for Hong Tailang in the animated comedy film I Love Wolffy 2.

In 2014, she co-starred with Hawick Lau and Zanilia Zhao in the romantic comedy television series The Wife’s Secret.

In 2015, she played Qiu Ya, the lead role in the comedy film Goodbye Mr. Loser, costarring Shen Teng and Ma Li. It was released in September 2015, and was instantly a huge critical and box office success. The film grossed US$226.6 million in China, and US$228.5 million worldwide. She won the Most Potentiality Award at the Macau International Movie Festival, and was nominated for Best Actress at the 33rd Hundred Flowers Awards.

In 2016, she appeared in Kwak Jae-yong's Crying Out In Love, a film adaptation based on the novel Socrates in Love by Kyoichi Katayama.

Filmography

Film

Television

Drama

TV Shows

Film and TV Awards

References

External links

Wang Zhi at douban.com 
Wang Zhi at chinesemov.com

1983 births
Living people
Actresses from Liaoning
21st-century Chinese actresses
Central Academy of Drama alumni
Chinese film actresses
Chinese television actresses
People from Anshan